Vittorio Trento (ca. 1761 – 1833) was an Italian composer born in Venice. He studied composition under Ferdinando Bertoni at the Conservatorio dei Mendicanti in Venice. He was primarily known for his ballets of which he composed more than 50 for Venetian theatres. In his later years he also composed a number of operas, including Teresa vedova (Venice, 1802), Ines de Castro (Livorno 1803), and Giulio Sabino nel suo castello di Langres (Bologna, 1824). Trento died in Lisbon.

References

Italian male classical composers
1761 births
1833 deaths
Musicians from Venice
Italian opera composers
Male opera composers
19th-century classical composers
19th-century Italian composers
18th-century Italian composers
18th-century Italian male musicians
19th-century Italian male musicians